The Sharks is a 2019 Uruguayan coming-of-age drama film. The film is in Spanish. It was directed by Lucia Garibaldi and premiered at the 2019 Sundance Film Festival in the World Cinema Dramatic Competition. It has  rating on Rotten Tomatoes. It runs for 80 minutes. It became available on Video-on-Demand on April 14, 2020.

References 

Uruguayan coming-of-age films
2019 films
Uruguayan drama films